Schaprode is a municipality in the Vorpommern-Rügen district, in Mecklenburg-Vorpommern, Germany.

People 
 Filip Julius Bernhard von Platen (1732–1805), Swedish politician and field marshal

References

External links
 
 

Towns and villages on Rügen